The Right to Love (German: Das Recht auf Liebe) is a 1939 German drama film directed by Joe Stöckel and starring Magda Schneider, Anneliese Uhlig and Viktor Staal. Location shooting took place in the Tyrol.

Synopsis
The daughter of a wealthy landowner is engaged to be married. However a lowly maid on the estate comes between them, before eventually finding her own happiness with a local forester.

Cast

References

Bibliography 
 Waldman, Harry. Nazi Films In America, 1933-1942. McFarland & Co, 2008.

External links 
 

1939 films
1939 drama films
German drama films
Films of Nazi Germany
1930s German-language films
Films directed by Joe Stöckel
German black-and-white films
1930s German films